Society of Gentlemen can refer to:

 A Society of Gentlemen in Scotland, pseudonym of the authors of the Encyclopædia Britannica First Edition 
 Spalding Gentlemen's Society, a learned society of the United Kingdom, was founded in 1710
 Society of Gentleman Practisers in the Courts of Law and Equity
 Society of Gentlemen at Exeter

See also 
 The Society of Gentlemen Adventurers, episode of Red Panda Adventures